Christine Jones is an American scenic designer on Broadway. Her best-known designs include Spring Awakening, American Idiot, and Harry Potter and the Cursed Child. In 2010, she created an experimental, two-week project called Theatre for One in which one actor performs for one audience member. It was repeated in 2015. She is a professor at New York University and a lecturer at Princeton University.

Education
After graduating from the creative arts, literature and languages program at Marianopolis College in 1985, Jones earned her Bachelor of Fine Arts in design for theatre at Concordia University in 1989. She later earned her Master of Fine Arts at New York University.

Off-Broadway work
Jones has designed for many productions Off-Broadway:
 Mr. Fox
 Burn This
 Coraline
 Debbie Does Dallas
 First Love
 Flesh And Blood
 Much Ado About Nothing
 Nocturne
 People Be Heard
 The Onion Cellar
 True Love
 Cyrano, a 2019 musical production starring Peter Dinklage

Awards
In 2015, Jones was awarded the Obie Award presented by the American Theatre Wing for sustained excellence in set design.

Broadway
Jones made her Broadway scenic design debut in 2000 with her design for The Green Bird, directed by Julie Taymor.
Jones designed the set for the 2007 Tony Award-winning musical Spring Awakening. She was nominated for the Tony Award for Best Scenic Design but lost to Bob Crowley for Mary Poppins.
Jones designed the set for the 2010 musical American Idiot, for which she earned her first Tony Award. Jones has said, "It's just great to be recognized for doing something that you love, with people you love."
Jones also designed the set for the 2011 musical revival of "On a Clear Day You Can See Forever" starring Harry Connick Jr. and the 2016 production of Harry Potter and the Cursed Child in London's West-End.

Awards

Personal life
Jones is married to actor Dallas Roberts. They have two children.

References

External links
 Biography at the American Repertory Theatre
  Christine Jones IBDB

American scenic designers
Women scenic designers
Broadway set designers
Year of birth missing (living people)
Living people
Tisch School of the Arts alumni
New York University faculty
Place of birth missing (living people)
Concordia University alumni
Tony Award winners
Laurence Olivier Award winners
Princeton University faculty